Shockoe Creek is a  long 2nd order tributary to the Banister River in Pittsylvania County, Virginia.

Course 
Shockoe Creek rises about 1.5 miles north of Spring Garden, Virginia and then flows northeast to join the Banister River about 0.5 miles east-southeast of Markham.

Watershed 
Shockoe Creek drains  of area, receives about 45.5 in/year of precipitation, has a wetness index of 431.11, and is about 59% forested.

See also 
 List of Virginia Rivers

References 

Rivers of Virginia
Rivers of Pittsylvania County, Virginia
Tributaries of the Roanoke River